was a town in Ōkawa District, Kagawa Prefecture, Japan.

On April 1, 2002, Sangawa, along with the towns of Ōkawa, Nagao, Shido and Tsuda (all from Ōkawa District), was merged to create the city of Sanuki.

References

Dissolved municipalities of Kagawa Prefecture
Sanuki, Kagawa